John Cook (27 July 1887–1952) was an English footballer who played in the Football League for Middlesbrough, Northampton Town and Notts County.

References

1887 births
1952 deaths
English footballers
Association football forwards
English Football League players
South Bank F.C. players
Middlesbrough F.C. players
Notts County F.C. players
Northampton Town F.C. players